Zevenheuvelenloop (Seven Hills Run in English) is an annual 15 kilometres road running race held in Nijmegen, Netherlands. It was first organised in 1984 and has grown to be one of the largest road races in the Netherlands; it attracted over 30,000 runners in 2008.

History
The inaugural edition of the race in 1984 featured only an 11.9 kilometre course as the Dutch athletics federation (Koninklijke Nederlandse Atletiek Unie) would not allow new races to be longer than 12 km. The current undulating, hilly course begins in Nijmegen, follows a path to Groesbeek and then loops back towards Nijmegen to the finish line. Zevenheuvelenloop lends itself to fast times: Felix Limo broke the men's world record in 2001 and, at the 2009 edition, Tirunesh Dibaba broke the women's world record over 15 km. In 2010, Leonard Komon improved Limo's World Record by running 41:13. In 2018, Joshua Cheptegei won the Zevenheuvelenloop in 41:05, setting the current World Record for 15 km. In 2019, Letesenbet Gidey won the Zevenheuvelenloop in 44:20, setting the current World Record for 15 km.

A number of athletes have achieved victory at the Zevenheuvelenloop on multiple occasions; Tonnie Dirks, Tegla Loroupe, Mestawet Tufa, Sileshi Sihine and Haile Gebrselassie have each won the race three times, and Joshua Cheptegei has won the race four times. The 2002 winner, South African Irvette Van Blerk won the race at the age of fifteen, having entered the race while holidaying in the Netherlands. The race was used as the test event for the development of the ChampionChip personal RFID timing system.

Winners

Key:

Statistics

As of 7 October 2019

Winners by country

Multiple winners

bold italic = world record

References
General
Krol, Maarten & van Hemert, Wim (2008-11-17). Zevenheuvelenloop 15 km. Association of Road Racing Statisticians. Retrieved on 2009-11-15.
Specific

External links
Official website

15K runs
Recurring sporting events established in 1984
1984 establishments in the Netherlands
Athletics competitions in the Netherlands
Sports competitions in Gelderland
Sports competitions in Nijmegen
Sport in Berg en Dal (municipality)